Fructuós Gelabert (1874–1955) was a Catalan inventor and screenwriter. He was also a film director, directing over 100 films.

External links
 

1874 births
1955 deaths
Spanish inventors
Spanish male screenwriters
20th-century Spanish screenwriters
20th-century Spanish male writers